Pol Carreras (born January 17, 1990 in Barcelona) is an alpine skier from Spain. He competed for Spain at the 2014 Winter Olympics in the slalom and giant slalom.

Olympic results

References 

1990 births
Living people
Spanish male alpine skiers
Olympic alpine skiers of Spain
Alpine skiers at the 2014 Winter Olympics
Sportspeople from Barcelona
Competitors at the 2015 Winter Universiade
21st-century Spanish people